Baccalario is an Italian surname. Notable people with the surname include:

 Angelo Baccalario (1852–?), Italian painter of landscapes
 Pierdomenico Baccalario (born 1974), Italian author of children's and young adult fiction

Italian-language surnames